Dragan Jovanović is a Serbian politician. He served in the National Assembly of Serbia from 1991 to 1993 as a member of the Socialist Party of Serbia (Socijalistička partija Srbije, SPS). Jovanović later joined the Movement of Socialists (Pokret socijalista, PS).

Early life and career
Jovanović was born in Aleksinac, in what was then the People's Republic of Serbia in the Federal People's Republic of Yugoslavia. He holds a Bachelor of Laws degree. He was president of the Socialist Youth Alliance of Aleksinac in the 1980s.

Politician
Jovanović was elected to the national assembly for Aleksinac and Ražanj in the 1990 Serbian parliamentary election, the first to be held after the reintroduction of multi-party politics to Serbia. The Socialist Party won a majority government, and Jovanović served as a supporter of the administration. He did not seek re-election in 1992.

He later left the SPS and joined the breakaway Movement of Socialists, becoming secretary of the party's board in Aleksinac in 2014. 

In 2015, he organized an event to commemorate Republic Day in the former Socialist Federal Republic of Yugoslavia.

Electoral Record

National Assembly of Serbia

References

1960 births

Living people
People from Aleksinac
Members of the National Assembly (Serbia)
Socialist Party of Serbia politicians
Movement of Socialists politicians